Brugière is a surname. Notable people with the surname include:

Amable Guillaume Prosper Brugière (1782–1866), French statesman and historian
Pierre Brugière (1730–1803), French priest and Jansenist

See also
Brugère

French-language surnames